Diner Dash 2: Restaurant Rescue is the second installment in the popular game series Diner Dash preceded by Diner Dash and followed by Diner Dash: Flo on the Go. It is published by PlayFirst, like all other Diner Dash series.

Story 
Flo, a successful waitress, has just seen on the news that Mr. Big, a greedy landlord, wants to destroy four restaurants that belong to Darla, Tony, Margarita and Toshiro, respectively - so that he can open his own "Mega Multiplex Food Plaza". Flo runs to help each of her friends, and arrives just in time to stop Mr. Big and earn a chance to make enough money to pay him back.

Reception and awards 
Gamezebo, the leading editorial outlet for casual games, reviewed Diner Dash 2 positively stating that it was a "pulse-pounding quick jolt of excitement." The game won a Zeeby award for Best Arcade & Action Game of 2006.

See also 
 Diner Dash: Flo on the Go
 Diner Dash: Hometown Hero
 Diner Dash
 Diner Dash: Flo Through Time

References

External links 
 Official site
 Official game series site
 Official game series site (old)

2006 video games
MacOS games
Games built with Playground SDK
Video games about food and drink
Video games developed in the United States
Video games featuring female protagonists
Windows games
PlayFirst games